The 2000–01 season was the second season in the history of Football Kingz. It was also the second season in the National Soccer League.

Players

Competitions

Overview

National Soccer League

League table

Results by round

Matches

Notes:

Statistics

Appearances and goals
Players with no appearances not included in the list.

Clean sheets

References

Football Kingz FC seasons